Oneida luniferella is a species of snout moth in the genus Oneida. It was described by George Duryea Hulst in 1895. It is found in the western part of the United States and Mexico.

Subspecies
Oneida luniferella luniferella
Oneida luniferella pallidalis Barnes & Benjamin, 1924

References

Moths described in 1895
Epipaschiinae